Randolph T. Hester is a professor in the Department of Landscape Architecture and Environmental Planning at the University of California at Berkeley. Hester is also a sociologist, practicing landscape architect and co-director of Community Development by Design, a neighborhood planning organization focused on community participation and input.  Randolph Hester has also published a number of books central to the topic of designing neighborhoods, cities and landscapes; his most recent book Design for Ecological Democracy was published in September 2010.

Biography 
Hester grew up in rural North Carolina. He acquired a BA in Landscape Architecture and a BA in Sociology from North Carolina State University, and eventually went on to achieve an MA in Landscape Architecture at Harvard. Hester published his first book Neighborhood Space in 1975.

Awards and distinctions
2011 Kevin Lynch Award - presented by MIT School of Architecture and Planning

Publications
 Design for Ecological Democracy, Cambridge, Massachusetts: MIT Press, 2010. 
 Living Landscape: Reading Cultural Landscape Experiences, with S. Chang, S. Wang (Eds.), Taipei: Taiwan United Force Culture Enterprise Co. Ltd, 1999.
 A Theory for Building Community, with S. Chang, Taipei: Yungliou Press, 1999.
 Democratic Design in the Pacific Rim, with C. Kweskin (Eds.), Mendocino, California: Ridge Times Press, 1999.
 Techniques for Machizukuri, with M. Dohi, Gendaikikakushitsu Press, 1997.
 The Meaning of Gardens, with M. Fancis (Eds.), Cambridge, Massachusetts: MIT Press, 1990. 
 Community Design Primer, Mendocino, California: Ridge Times Press, 1990. 
 Community Goal Setting, with F.J. Smith, Stroudsburg, Pennsylvania: Dowden, Hutchinson and Ross Inc., 1982.
 Planning Neighborhood Space with People, New York: Van Nostrand Reinhold Company, 1982. 
 Neighborhood Space, Stroudsburg, Pennsylvania: Dowden, Hutchinson and Ross Inc., 1975.

Further reading

References

External links 
 Hester MIT Award
 Hester Design Observer Article

American landscape architects
Living people
Harvard Graduate School of Design alumni
UC Berkeley College of Environmental Design faculty
North Carolina State University alumni
Year of birth missing (living people)